Al Hala Sports Club is a Bahraini football and basketball club based in Halat Bu Maher, Muharraq. They play in the top division in Bahraini football.

Achievements
 Bahraini Premier League: 1
1979
 Bahraini Second Division League: 1
2006 
 Bahraini King's Cup: 3
1976, 1980, 1981

Football clubs in Bahrain